Macleod is a suburb in Melbourne, Victoria, Australia,  north-east of Melbourne's Central Business District, located within the Cities of Banyule and Darebin local government areas. Macleod recorded a population of 9,892 at the 2021 census.

Macleod West refers to the predominantly residential locality to the west of the railway line and station.

History

One of the first subdivisions in Macleod occurred on 12 November 1910. 133 allotments from the Strathallan Estate were auctioned, fronting Greensborough Road, Strathallan Road, Edward Street and Railway Place (Somers Avenue). At the time the area comprising Macleod and Rosanna was called North Heidelberg.

In 1910, Mr M. A. Macleod sold 75 acres of land along the railway line to the Bent government with the stipulation that a railway station be built a mile and a half beyond Rosanna, probably named "Macleod". The sale was requested by the government after they purchased 1,000 acres from the Bamfield's estate at Mont Park for a new psychiatric hospital. This purchase was cut off from the railway, so in order to gain access, they approached the landowner Mr M. A. Macleod to sell a strip of land along the railway line.

Macleod railway station opened in 1911, 9 years after the railway line passed through.

Macleod Post Office opened on 11 December 1923, located in the general store on the south-west corner of Greensborough and Strathallan Roads. It was replaced by the Simpson Barracks office in 1987. Macleod West Post Office opened in 1954 on McNamara Street, between Dunstan and Ruthven Streets.

The first Aberdeen Road shops were built in the early to mid-1950s, between Erskine Road and Leith Road.

Macleod Primary School was built in 1926 on 4.5 acres of land on Greensborough Road, between Coolie Avenue and Fairlie Avenue.

Macleod High School opened on 31 May 1954 after a one-week delay caused by the condition of unmade roads, which prevented furniture deliveries. The headmaster was Mr. F. J. Meyer. The initial enrollment consisted of 70 boys and 160 girls.

Demographics

In Macleod, 68.5% of people were born in Australia. Excluding Australia, the most common countries of birth were China (excludes SARs and Taiwan) 3.4%, England 2.8%, India 1.8%, Italy 1.6%, and Malaysia 1.1%. 71.4% of people only spoke English at home. Other languages spoken at home included, Mandarin 3.9%, Italian 2.9%, Cantonese 1.3%, Greek 1.2% and Macedonian 1.2%.

Facilities

Public library services are provided by Yarra Plenty Regional Library. The nearest library is Watsonia Library.

Sport

Macleod's local Australian rules football team is the Macleod Kangaroos, who play in Division 1 of the Northern Football League (NFL). As of 2008, they have played in three Grand Finals in a row. They are based at De Winton Park in Rosanna. They are affiliated with the Macleod Junior Football Club (known as the Eagles), who play in the Yarra Junior Football League (YJFL). The junior football club is based at Macleod Park.

Macleod's cricket team is the Macleod Eagles. They play in the Diamond Valley Cricket Association (DVCA), and were playing in the second division (known as Money Shield) until a premiership in 2007–08 saw them promoted to the first division (Barclay Shield) for the 2008–09 season. They are based at Macleod Park, known as "The Nest". In 2008–09, Macleod will field 4 senior teams, and 6 junior sides as well as a thriving "Milo in2cricket" program.

The Banyule & Districts Netball Association, located in Somers Avenue, is an affiliated member of Netball Victoria. They run NetSetGo, junior and senior netball competitions. They have a four court indoor stadium and two additional outdoor courts (if required).

There is also a local basketball team called the Banyule Hawks, whose home ground is the Macleod Recreation Centre.

Transport

Bus
Three bus routes service Macleod:

 : Eltham station – Glenroy station via Greensborough. Operated by Dysons.
 : Kew (Cotham Road) – La Trobe University. Operated by Ventura Bus Lines.
 : Macleod – Pascoe Vale station via La Trobe University. Operated by Dysons.

Train
Macleod is served by one railway station: Macleod, located on the Hurstbridge line.

See also
 City of Heidelberg – Parts of Macleod were previously within this former local government area.
 Shire of Diamond Valley – Parts of Macleod were previously within this former local government area.

References

External links

Macleod
Macleod
Macleod